Andrew Emory Dessler (born 1964) is a climate scientist. He is Professor of Atmospheric Sciences and holder of the Reta A. Haynes Chair in Geoscience at Texas A&M University. He is also the Director of the Texas Center for Climate Studies. His research subject areas include climate impacts, global climate physics, atmospheric chemistry, climate change and climate change policy.

Early life and education
Dessler was born in 1964, in Houston, Texas to Alex Dessler and Lorraine Barbara Dessler. He received a B.A. in physics from Rice University in 1986 and an M.A. and Ph.D in chemistry from Harvard University in 1990 and 1994. His doctoral thesis was titled In situ stratospheric ozone measurements.

Career
Dessler worked in the energy group at The First Boston Corporation doing mergers and acquisitions analysis in the mid-1980s. He left his job as an investment banker on Wall Street in 1988 to go to graduate school in chemistry. After receiving his Ph.D. in 1994, Dessler did two years of Postdoctoral research at NASA's Goddard Space Flight Center and then spent nine years on the research faculty of the University of Maryland from 1996 to 2005. Dessler went on to become an Associate Professor of Atmospheric Sciences at Texas A&M University from 2005 to 2007 and has been a tenured Professor of Atmospheric Sciences there since 2007.

He served as an editor for the American Geophysical Union Books Board from 1997 to 2002, and an associate editor for the Journal of Geophysical Research in 2002.

Dessler also served as a Senior Policy Analyst in the White House Office of Science and Technology Policy for the last year of the Clinton administration. That experience was the basis for the book he co-authored, The Science and Politics of Global Climate Change: A Guide to the Debate.

He also published a blog for Grist magazine from 2006 to 2009.  He later stated, "At first, I was enamoured with blogging, until I realized how repetitive it was to keep answering the same questions. I decided I wanted a more high-impact way to spend my time." The New York Times said the results of his 2004 article in the Journal of Climate written with Ken Minschwaner placed them, "in the middle between the skeptics and those who argue that warming caused by burning of fossil fuels could be extremely severe." The authors wrote a joint letter to the editor in response objecting to the impression given by the article that their "research goes against the consensus scientific view that global warming is a serious concern." They went on to state their work did not argue against the seriousness of the problem and that the potential effects were so serious "that slight overestimates of this warming make little difference -- just as reducing the size of a firing squad from 10 shooters to nine makes little difference to the person being executed." A 2009 article in Science showed "warming from rising carbon dioxide should also lead to increased water vapor and additional warming, doubling the warming effect of the carbon dioxide." according to Kenneth Chang of The New York Times.

Currently, Dessler is an editor of the Bulletin of the American Meteorological Society and president-elect of the Global Environmental Change section of the American Geophysical Union. He is also the Director of the Texas Center for Climate Studies and holder of the Rita A. Haynes Chair in Geosciences at Texas A&M University.

Books
Dessler and Edward Parson co-authored, The Science and Politics of Global Climate Change: A Guide to the Debate in 2006 (2nd ed. 2009). It was described as, "a fascinating hybrid of science and policy directed at a broad or nonspecialist audience" by Wendy Gordon in a 2008 review in Eos. Gordon's review was positive concluding, "I could comfortably recommend this book to friend and colleagues." and that it would be "an excellent resource for a high school of college-level survey course in either environmental studies or public policy." It also received a favorable review in the Bulletin of the American Meteorological Society by Paul Higgins. Higgins noted the book's, "careful reasoning and thoughtful presentation" and stated it was a sound guide to the climate change debate. Concluding a generally positive review Randall Wigle writing in Canadian Public Policy stated, "...I believe it is a good candidate for a primer for multidisciplinary classes devoted to climate change policy, but it would have been an even better one with less advocacy of one side of the argument." Maria Ivanova wrote in Global Environmental Politics that the book's scholarly value was indisputable. Writing in New Scientist in 2006 Adrian Barnett said, "Free copies should be shipped to anyone who doubts the reality of climate change, starting with presidents in denial." The book also received very positive reviews in Chromatographia, the Times Higher Education Supplement (THES) and Environmental Sciences.

In 2012 Dessler wrote Introduction to Modern Climate Change "a textbook for non-science majors that uniquely immerses the reader in the science, impacts, economics, policies and political debate associated with climate change." It received an award from the American Meteorological Society in 2014. It was favorably reviewed by Cameron Reed in Physics & Society who said, "The writing is clear, has a nice balance of formal and informal prose, and includes occasional elements of dry humor to lighten discussions of otherwise very serious issues." It is used in classes in environmental sciences and the science and policy of climate change.

Climate change policy

Dessler has been consulted by newspapers and has given talks on climate change and government policy. On January 16, 2014 he testified before the US Senate Committee on Environment and Public Works. He stated that with almost 200 years of study by the scientific community of the climate system a robust understanding has emerged. He continued stating, the climate is warming and "humans are now in the driver's seat". He concluded, "We know that, over the next century, if nothing is done to rein in emissions, temperatures will likely increase enough to profoundly change the planet." He gave a talk at the Goddard Space Flight Center in 2013 titled, "The Alternate Reality of Climate Skeptics" in which he explained how "climate skeptics have constructed an alternate reality to believe it [sic]. In this way, the debate over climate change turns into a debate over which reality should be believed." In 2010 when US Senator James Inhofe attempted to block the US Environmental Protection Agency from regulating greenhouse gases under the Clean Air Act, Dessler told reporters he was confident that individual errors don't invalidate the scientific consensus that global temperature is rising stating, "That's not how science works." He asserted his confidence that the climate is warming due to human activity and that this will have "catastrophic impacts" stating, "The evidence includes a mountain of data." Dessler cited replication by multiple institutions as support.

Dessler has suggested that scientists advocating for climate change mitigation should tell their personal stories and that this would reveal the strategy of ad hominem attacks by climate change deniers, an attempt to portray scientists to audiences as "not 'like them.'" He said by revealing their backstory scientists can build trust and show people that they share their values. In December 2013 Dessler spoke at a workshop about his experiences with a request for all of his emails at Texas A&M from the American Tradition Institute's Chris Horner using the Texas Public Information Act. He had received support from Scott Mandia of the Climate Science Legal Defense Fund, the Public Employees for Environmental Responsibility and the Union of Concerned Scientists.

Texas and politics
When then presidential candidate Rick Perry suggested that scientists were frequently questioning "that manmade global warming is what is causing the climate to change." Dessler was interviewed by NPR to represent the mainstream scientific consensus. With Perry's home state suffering a severe drought, Dessler (a native Texan) did not attribute the extreme weather that year (2011) to climate change, but he said, "We can be confident we’ve made this hellish summer worse than it would have been."

Clouds and climate change

A front page article in The New York Times examining the theory that clouds might offset the effects of increased greenhouse gasses found that his analysis in a 2011 article in Geophysical Research Letters "offered some evidence that clouds will exacerbate the long-term planetary warming" Following the publication of the New York Times article "Dessler became a target of climate science critics" and was interviewed on the PBS show Frontline for the episode "Climate of Doubt" which explored "the massive shift in public opinion on climate change." As a visiting fellow at the Cooperative Institute for Research in Environmental Sciences in 2013 and 2014 he is undertaking a project titled, "Understanding long-term variations in stratospheric water vapor." In a November 2013 article in the Proceedings of the National Academy of Sciences of the United States of America Dessler and colleagues provide observational evidence of a positive feedback effect of stratospheric water vapor and global warming.

Personal life
Dessler was described as an avid glider pilot in 2006. He is married with two children and lives in College Station, Texas.

Awards and honors
1991-1994 - NASA Graduate Student Fellowship in Global Change Research
1993 - American Geophysical Union Atmospheric Sciences Section Outstanding Student Paper Award
1994-1996 - National Research Council Research Associateship
1999 - NASA New Investigator Award
1999 - NASA Goddard Laboratory for Atmospheres Best Senior Author Publication Award
2006 - Aldo Leopold Leadership Program Fellowship, Stanford Woods Institute for the Environment, Stanford University
2011 - Google Science Communication Fellow
2011 - Texas A&M University Sigma Xi Outstanding Science Communicator Award
2012 - Atmospheric Sciences Section Ascent Award, American Geophysical Union
2012 - H. Burr Steinbach Visiting Scholar, Woods Hole Oceanographic Institute
2012 - Thompson Lecturer, National Center for Atmospheric Research
2013 - Visiting Fellow Cooperative Institute for Research in Environmental Sciences
2014 - Louis J. Battan Author's Award, American Meteorological Society
2019 - Fellow of the American Geophysical Union
2022 - "Friend of the Planet" award from the National Center for Science Education (NCSE)

Publications

Books authored

Books co-authored
 (2009. 2nd ed. ).

Selected articles

References

External links
 Complete list of publications
. A short video on climate feedback by Dessler.
. A debate between Dessler and climate change skeptic Fred Singer at Texas A&M on 2013-02-13.
 

American meteorologists
Living people
Rice University alumni
Harvard Graduate School of Arts and Sciences alumni
Texas A&M University faculty
1964 births
People from Houston
Atmospheric chemists
University of Maryland, College Park faculty
Fellows of the American Geophysical Union